Between Me and the Wardrobe, the third album by British singer-songwriter Gwyneth Herbert, and her first album to consist entirely of self-penned songs, was released in 2006 on Herbert's own Monkeywood Records label and reissued in 2007 by Blue Note Records. It was given a five-starred review in The Observer.

Production and release
After she left Universal Classics and Jazz to pursue a less commercial and more personal musical direction, Herbert collaborated with Polar Bear's Seb Rochford in a production role for this album. Self-financed by Herbert, it was recorded in three days and was never intended for general release. It was initially released, in 2006, on Herbert's own Monkeywood label before being picked up by Blue Note Records, making Herbert their first UK signing in 30 years.

Reception
In a five-starred review for The Observer, Stuart Nicholson said that on Between Me and the Wardrobe Herbert "lets the lyrics do the work for her. They are well thought out, moving between artfully constructed soft-focus simplicities to poignant yearning".

Colin Buttimer, writing for BBC Music, said: "stories are very much to the fore, in fact many of these songs are compacted narrative jewels... The music is oak-like, rich and weathered... Seb Rochford, best known as the strikingly hirsute drummer for Polar Bear, Fulborn Taversham and Acoustic Ladyland, is responsible for a production that’s stripped-down, but full of unexpected and highly rewarding details".

John Fordham, in a review for The Guardian, said: "Herbert's originals (all the pieces are hers) connect more with Janis Ian or Rufus Wainwright than the standards the subtly intelligent Herbert at first seemed destined for. Jazzers might be foxed by Blue Note's endorsement of this low-key, folk-inflected and very personal vision, but... the lyrics gleam with individuality... and though the tunes could have used a few more twists and turns, it confirms that Herbert is light years from the whisper-in-your-ear Krall clone some dismissed her as".

Track listing

References

External links
 Gwyneth Herbert: official website

2006 albums
Gwyneth Herbert albums